Monodontomerus is a genus of chalcid wasps in the family Torymidae.

References

Hymenoptera genera
Chalcidoidea